The Bulletin de la Société Chimique de France was a French peer-reviewed scientific journal on chemistry published by the Société Chimique de France. It was established in 1858 under the title Bulletin de la Société Chimique de Paris, under which additional name it appeared until the end of series 3.

The journal was published in several series:
 Bulletin de la Société Chimique de France, Vol. 1 (1858) – Vol. 6 (1863) (= 1. Ser.).
 Bulletin de la Société Chimique de France, N.S. (= 2. Ser., Vol. 1 (1864) – Vol. 50 (1888), (ISSN 0037-8968).
 Bulletin de la Société Chimique de France, 3. Ser., Vol. 1 (1889) – Vol. 36 (1906), (ISSN 0037-8968).
 Bulletin de la Société Chimique de France, 4. Ser., Vol. 1 (1907) – Vol. 54 (1933).

The fourth series of this journal was published as:
 Bulletin de la Société Chimique de France, 4. Ser, Analyse des travaux étrangers, Vol. 1 (1907) - Vol. 28 (1920),.
 Bulletin de la Société Chimique de France, 4. Ser., Analyse des travaux français et étrangers, Vol. 29 (1921) - Vol. 54 (1933),.

With the beginning of the fifth series, the journal was renamed as:
 Bulletin de la Société Chimique de France, Mémoires, (= 5. Sér.), Vol. 1 (1934) – Vol. 12 (1945), (CODEN BSCDAM),
 Bulletin de la Société Chimique de France, Documentation, Vol. 1 (1933) - Vol. 12 (1946),, CODEN BSCDAM).

After World War II, the titles were merged and published as:
 Bulletin de la Société Chimique de France, Vol. 13 (1946) – Vol. 134 (1997), (CODEN BSCFAS).

The title was split in two parts from 1973–1984:
 Bulletin de la Société Chimique de France : Partie 1, Chimie analytique, chimie minérale, physicochimie
 Bulletin de la Société Chimique de France : Partie 2, Chimie moléculaire, organique et biologique

In 1985 the two parts were merged again until 1997 as:
 Bulletin de la Société Chimique de France.

In 1998 the journal was absorbed by the European Journal of Organic Chemistry and the European Journal of Inorganic Chemistry.

See also 
 Anales de Química
 Chemische Berichte
 Bulletin des Sociétés Chimiques Belges
 European Journal of Organic Chemistry
 European Journal of Inorganic Chemistry
 Gazzetta Chimica Italiana
 Liebigs Annalen
 Recueil des Travaux Chimiques des Pays-Bas
 Chimika Chronika
 Revista Portuguesa de Química
 ACH—Models in Chemistry

References

External links 
 Société Chimique de France

Chemistry journals
Publications disestablished in 1997
French-language journals
Publications established in 1858
1858 establishments in France
Defunct journals
Academic journals published by learned and professional societies